Aleksandr Nikolayevich Averyanov (1 October 1948 – 15 June 2021) was a Soviet and Russian professional football coach and player.

Playing career
As a player, Averyanov made his debut in the Soviet Top League in 1966 for Chornomorets Odessa.

Managerial career
He started his managing career at Tekstilshhik Andijan in 1984. In 2010, he managed FC Dynamo St. Petersburg.

Personal life
His son, Aleksandr, played football professionally, often in the teams his father coached.

Averyanov died on 15 June 2021 at the age of 72.

References

1948 births
2021 deaths
Sportspeople from Vladivostok
Soviet footballers
Association football midfielders
Soviet Top League players
FC Chornomorets Odesa players
MFC Mykolaiv players
FC Zvezda Tiraspol players
FC Zorya Luhansk players
FC Lokomotiv Moscow players
Russian football managers
FK Andijan managers
Russian Premier League managers
FC Okean Nakhodka managers
PFC Krylia Sovetov Samara managers
FC Shinnik Yaroslavl managers
FC Elista managers
FC Spartak Vladikavkaz managers
FC Fakel Voronezh managers
FC Atyrau managers
Russian expatriate sportspeople in Kazakhstan
FC Volgar Astrakhan managers
FC Dynamo Saint Petersburg managers